The following is an incomplete list of works by the Flemish painter Anthony van Dyck (1599–1641).

Portraits (1613–1632)
Between 1613 and 1632, van Dyck travelled all over Europe – from his native Antwerp (where he began working as a painter, initially under Hendrick van Balen and later with Peter Paul Rubens), to England for a brief stay at the court of James I and then to Italy, where he had the chance to get to know the old masters. He then finally settled back in Flanders.

Portraits (1632–1649)
From 1632 until his death in 1641, van Dyck travelled regularly to London and the court of his patron Charles I. An art lover, Charles I made van Dyck his Principal Painter and a baronet. In between he spent short periods in Antwerp, Brussels and Paris, where he hoped to become a court painter to Louis XIII of France.

Mythological paintings
Mainly celebrated as a portraitist, van Dyck also produced several historical, religious and mythological works.

Religious paintings

Note
All information on dimensions, location and dates are taken from the two books in the bibliography.

Bibliography
 Christopher Brown, Antonie Van Dyck 1599–1641, Milano, RCS Libri, 1999, .
 Erik Larsen, L'opera completa di Van Dyck 1626–1641, Milano, Rizzoli, 1980.

External links
 Anthony van Dyck catalog raisonné, 1980 on Wikimedia Commons
 Other Catalogs of art by Anthony van Dyck on Wikimedia Commons

References

 
van Dyck